Centro de Eventos Bima is a concert center located next to the Bima Oulet Mall in Bogotá, Colombia. The place has a capacity for 12 thousand people. The artists that have arisen are:

Concerts

References

Buildings and structures in Bogotá